Monika Kryemadhi (born 9 April 1974) is an Albanian politician, member of Parliament and former leader of the Socialist Movement for Integration party. She is also the wife of the former President of Albania Ilir Meta. Monika Kryemadhi refused the position of First Lady of Albania—delegating the role instead to her eldest daughter, Bora.

Early life and education
She was born on April 9, 1974, in Tirana. In 1992, she won the right to study in the Faculty of Natural Sciences in the Bio-Chemistry branch. In 1999, she performed studies at the George Marshall Center in Garmisch-Partenkirchen for regional security policies. In 2000-2002 carried out studies in the Master of Business Administration at the University of Tirana, Faculty of Economy, in cooperation with the University of Nebraska. She has also performed other postgraduate studies and got her PhD at the Faculty of Economy of the University of Tirana.

She is married to Ilir Meta and has three children: Bora, Besar, and Era Metaj.

Politics
Her political engagement began in 1991 when she was one of the founders of FRESSH. In January 1992 she was elected a member of the Presidency and in May of the same year, she was elected General Secretary of FRESSH's congress I and II. She served as President of FRESSH until April 2002. From 1995 to 2000 she was elected Vice President of the Socialist International Youth IUSY.

Monika was a member of the Socialist Party from December 1991 to September 2004. During this time she was also a member of the Parliament of Albania from 2001 to 2005, and also was selected two times to the Tirana Municipal Council for which she was elected secretary of the local government delegation to the Council of Europe. In September 2004, she was one of the founders of the Socialist Movement for Integration.

2017—present
On 5 July 2017, Kryemadhi became the leader of the Socialist Movement for Integration. Although she is the spouse of former President Ilir Meta, she refused to take the honorific position of First Lady of Albania, conceding the post to their oldest daughter. On 25 July 2022, Ilir Meta took over the leadership of the Socialist Movement for Integration after his term as president had ended.

Kryemadhi is currently also serving in the Parliament of Albania as a member for Fier.

Controversy
In October 2018, many public figures and politicians in Albania were involved in a huge plagiarism scandal, involving their Masters and Ph.D. theses. The denouncement of cases of plagiarism started by Taulant Muka, a young epidemiologist educated in the Netherlands, who waged a crusade against the “fake” PhDs held by many politicians and government functionaries. This scandal among other things, sparked nationwide protests from the students of public universities, requiring a vetting for all academic titles held by public figures, state officials and politicians

Television
She sang a duet with Majlinda Bregu on Kënga Magjike 07. At Kënga Magjike 07 she was on the jury.

Personal life
On 6 July 2019, Kryemadhi revealed that she had been diagnosed with uterine cancer, and had undergone surgery to remove a mass. As of 2019, she was fully cured.

References

External links 

Intervistë me kryetaren e LSI-së, Monika Kryemadhi (Voice of America)
Albania must stay the course of EU Integration says the nation’s most influential woman politician (New Europe)
New Politics for New Generation of Albania (European Interest)
Kryemadhi in Washington with Former Important Members of the American Congress (Albanian Daily News)

Living people
1974 births
Politicians from Tirana
Political party leaders of Albania
University of Tirana alumni
Socialist Movement for Integration politicians
First ladies of Albania
Members of the Parliament of Albania
Women members of the Parliament of Albania
21st-century Albanian women politicians
21st-century Albanian politicians